Events in the year 1943 in Bulgaria.

Incumbents 
Monarch – Boris III (until August 28), Simeon II (from August 28)
Regency council (from August 28)

Events 

 December 10 – The allies conduct bombing raids over Sofia.

References 

 
1940s in Bulgaria
Years of the 20th century in Bulgaria
Bulgaria
Bulgaria